A straight-line mechanism is a mechanism that converts any type of rotary or angular motion to perfect or near-perfect straight-line motion, or vice versa. Straight-line motion is linear motion of definite length or "stroke", every forward stroke being followed by a return stroke, giving reciprocating motion. 
The first such mechanism, patented in 1784 by James Watt, produced approximate straight-line motion, referred to by Watt as parallel motion.

Straight-line mechanisms are used in a variety of applications, such as engines, vehicle suspensions, walking robots, and rover wheels.

History 

In the late eighteenth century, before the development of the planer and the milling machine, it was extremely difficult to machine straight, flat surfaces.  During that era, much thought was given to the problem of attaining a straight-line motion, as this would allow the flat surfaces to be machined. To find a solution to the problem, the first straight line mechanism was developed by James Watt, for guiding the piston of early steam engines. Although it does not generate an exact straight line, a good approximation is achieved over a considerable distance of travel.

Perfect straight line linkages were later discovered in the nineteenth century, but they weren't as needed, as by then other techniques for machining had been developed.

List of linkages

Approximate straight line linkages 
These mechanisms often utilize four bar linkages as they require very few pieces. These four-bar linkages have coupler curves that have one or more regions of approximately perfect straight line motion. The exception in this list is Watt's parallel motion, which combines Watt's linkage with another four-bar linkage – the pantograph – to amplify the existing approximate straight line movement.

It is not possible to create perfectly straight line motion using a four-bar linkage, without using a prismatic joint.

Watt's linkage (1784)
Watt's parallel motion (1784)
Evans "Grasshopper" linkage (1801)
Chebyshev linkage
Chebyshev lambda linkage (1878) - a cognate linkage of the Chebyshev linkage
Roberts linkage
Horse-head linkage
Hoecken linkage (1926) - requires a sliding joint

Perfect straight line linkages 
Eventually, perfect straight line motion would be achieved.

The Sarrus linkage was the first perfect linear linkage, made in 1853. However, it is a spatial linkage rather than a planar linkage. The first planar linkage would not be made until 1864.

Currently, all planar linkages which produce perfect linear motion utilize the inversion around a circle to produce a hypothetical circle of infinite radius, which is a line. This is why they are called inversors or inversor cells.
The simplest solutions are Hart's W-frame – which use 6-bars – and the Quadruplanar inversors – Sylvester-Kempe and Kumara-Kampling, which also use 6-bars.

Sarrus linkage (1853)
Peaucellier-Lipkin inversor (1864)
Hart's first inversor / Hart's antiparallelogram / Hart's W-frame (1874)
Hart's second inversor / Hart's A-frame (1875)
Perrolatz inversor
Kempe's double kite inversors (1875)
Bricard inversor
Quadruplanar inversor (1875)

The Scott Russell linkage (1803) translates linear motion through a right angle, but is not a straight line mechanism in itself. The Grasshopper beam/Evans linkage, an approximate straight line linkage, and the Bricard linkage, an exact straight line linkage, share similarities with the Scott Russell linkage and the Trammel of Archimedes.

Compound eccentric mechanisms with elliptical motion 
These mechanisms use the principle of a rolling curve instead of a coupler curve and can convert continuous, rather than just limited, rotary motion to reciprocating motion and vice versa via elliptical motion. The straight-line sinusoidal motion produces no second-order inertial forces, which simplifies balancing in high-speed machines.

Cardan straight line mechanism. Using the principle of the Tusi couple (1247), a spur gear rolls inside an internally toothed ring gear of twice the diameter. The hypocycloid traced by any point on the pitch circle of the smaller gear is a diameter of the larger gear. The mechanism has been used in Murray's Hypocyclic Engine.

Trammel of Archimedes. Originally an ellipsograph. As a mechanism, it uses the fact that a circle and a straight line are special cases of an ellipse. It is based on much the same kinematic principle as Cardan's straight line mechanism (above) and could be considered as a spur gear with two teeth in a ring gear with four teeth. It has been used in the Baker-Cross engine.  It has been used in inverted form in Parsons' steam engine and can still be found today in a further inversion as the Oldham coupling.

MultiFAZE mechanism. The Multiple Fixed Axis Shaft Compound Eccentric mechanism also uses elliptical motion, but here the contrarotating parts are not coaxial, but separated laterally, and the drive between them is transmitted by spur gears instead of a bearing, to reduce friction and wear.  The mechanism has been used in a cantilever configuration in the Stiller-Smith engine.

Gallery

Approximate straight line linkages 
Parts/links of the same color are the same dimensions.

Perfect straight line linkages 
Parts/links of the same color are the same dimensions.

Tusi couple, elliptical motion: versions and inversions

Compound eccentric mechanisms with elliptical motion

See also

Four-bar linkage
Linkage (mechanical)
Rigid chain actuator

Notes

References

 Theory of Machines and Mechanisms, Joseph Edward Shigley

External links
Cornell university (archived) - Straight-line mechanism models

 
Simulations using the Molecular Workbench software
bham.ac.uk - Hart's A-frame (draggable animation) 6-bar linkage

Linkages (mechanical)
Linear motion

Straight line mechanisms